"WYAT (Where You At)" (also written as "WYAT") is a song by Filipino boy band SB19. John Paulo Nase wrote the song and produced it with his brother. Sony Music Philippines released "WYAT" as a single on September 2, 2022. It is a disco-pop-produced song with lyrics about reconnecting with people, and it is about going back to how it was: talking and meeting actual people, doing things together, re-creating the feeling before the life today. It was highlighting the group's ability to grow and how their music evolve through the times.

Jireh Christian Bacasno directed the music video for "WYAT (Where You At)" and Justin de Dios is the creative director. It premiered on YouTube on September 2, 2022. The music video is a retro concept set in 70s, ’80s, and ’90s eras, reconnecting with people from the past and going back to the era that people are not heavily dependent on modern communications devices. An era that actual people can talk and meet and doing things together.

SB19 performed "WYAT" on multiple occasions. On television, they performed the song on ASAP Natin 'To, on Wowowin, launching of All TV, on noontime variety show It's Showtime and to the longest running variety show in the Philippines, Eat Bulaga. "WYAT" was also included on the set list of their concert Where You At World Tour (2022).

Background and composition 
John Paulo Nase wrote "WYAT" and co-produced it with his brother Joshua Daniel Nase. Thyro Alfaro mixed the song while Greentea bro by Realbros Sound Studio Korea did the mastering. "Where You At" is three minutes and thirty-nine seconds long. Media outlets described "WYAT" as a disco-pop-produced, with edm classic rock-disco-infused, and funk, fusion, groove song. "WYAT" also features the SB19's signature hard-hitting beats, high tension, and high energy style.

"WYAT" reflects the humility of the group. As Pablo stated in the interview with Billboard:

Release and promotion 
For the first whole week of August, SB19 has been teasing their comeback. On August 12, SB19 released the single comeback title "WYAT" (Where You At), a disco-pop song that highlights the urgency of disconnection to reconnection of the times that should be releasing on September 2 with an official music video and a global concert tour kickoff in Manila on September 17 in Araneta Coliseum. The group's social media, especially Twitter, has erupted over the last few days after the boy group released a series of cryptic riddles and videos that led fans to speculate about a world tour. As a result, the hashtag #WhereIsSB19 has been trending on Twitter worldwide daily. SB19 released their final video of the series announcing that the single and tour will be launched in September.

On September 2, they released the music video for their comeback single "WYAT" (Where You At), from which the tour name was derived from.

Music video 
The music video was directed by Jireh Christian Bacasno through the creative direction of the band's sub-vocalist Justin, which was released on the same release date as the official audio on September 2, 2022. In the video, the members "showcased their singing and dancing skills while grooving to their retro styled outfits" designed for the concept. The design and theme of the music video was set in 70s, ’80s, and ’90s eras. The music video was inspired by retro life, a disco era. The retro-themed music video amplifies that dream to capture boundaries and generations, a trip to memory lane and to the futuristic era of our own music. "WYAT" is an encouragement to reconnect with the wonders of the past.

Credits and personnel 
Credits are adapted from Tidal and the song's music video.
 SB19 – main vocals
 John Paulo Nase – writer, producer
 Joshua Daniel Nase – producer
 Thyro Alfaro – mixing
 Greentea bro Realbros Sound Studio Korea – mixing and mastering
 Stellvester Ajero  – choreography
 Justin de Dios - creative director

References 

SB19 songs
2022 songs
2022 singles
Sony Music singles
English-language Filipino songs